Fort Gibson is a town in Cherokee and Muskogee counties in the U.S. state of Oklahoma. The population was 4,154 at the 2010 census, an increase of 2.5 percent over the figure of 4,054 recorded in 2000. It is the location of Fort Gibson Historical Site and Fort Gibson National Cemetery and is located near the end of the Cherokees' Trail of Tears at Tahlequah.

Colonel Matthew Arbuckle of the United States Army established Fort Gibson in 1824. The Army abandoned the fort in 1890. A recreation of the fort stands at the historic site, which was built as a Works Progress Administration project between 1935 and 1939, at a different location from the original fort.

The town calls itself "The Oldest Town in Oklahoma."

History
Fort Gibson was originally established as a military garrison, Cantonment Gibson, in April 1824. The camp was set up  to facilitate U.S. government policies of westward expansion and Indian removal. After the founding of Fort Gibson in 1824, military families, Indians desiring military protection, and free African-Americans settled near the fort, forming a town. After the Army abandoned Fort Gibson in 1857, the Cherokee Nation took over the military stockade and renamed the town Keetoowah. The Army reoccupied Fort Gibson during the American Civil War and was renamed Fort Blunt from 1862 - 1865 for Maj. Gen. James G. Blunt. The town again prospered as refugees from fighting elsewhere fled to the relative safety of the fort.

On May 20, 1898, the Articles of Incorporation for the town of Fort Gibson were established under the Arkansas Statutes, placing all of the densely settled areas under one jurisdiction.

The townspeople considered Fort Gibson poorly located after suffering fires, mosquitoes, and other afflictions. They moved the town to higher ground around 1900. The first buildings had faced west toward the Kansas and Arkansas Valley Railway (later the Missouri Pacific Railroad) tracks. In 1904 the town of Fort Gibson, Indian Territory, was surveyed and platted. In 1904 the town was turned around and situated one block east when J. C. Pierce built the first brick building. In 1906 John C. Berd constructed a brick-and-stone building for his drugstore, and the commercial district grew around these two permanent features. It had 1,063 residents in 1907.

One of the oldest non-Indian settlements in Oklahoma, Fort Gibson had other firsts for Oklahoma, such as: 
the first telephone,
first drama theater, 
first steamboat landing, 
first school for the blind, 
first highway to Fort Smith
the first interurban, which connected Fort Gibson to Muskogee.

In 1896 J. S. Holden started a weekly newspaper, the Post. At least six other newspapers followed in the early 20th century; the Fort Gibson Times continued into the 21st century.

In 1940, 1,233 people populated the town, and by 1970 there were 1,418 citizens. Home to twenty-six churches and fourteen civic clubs and organizations at the beginning of the 21st century, the town boasted a strong civic spirit. The town has a board of trustees type of government. The manufacturing industry supports the majority of workers, and the health care sector is  close behind. The 2000 census listed 4,054 residents, and the school system housed 1,900 students at a teacher-student ratio of one to fifteen.

Geography
Fort Gibson is located in northeastern Muskogee County at  (35.794861, -95.253090). A small portion of the town extends north into a corner of Cherokee County. Fort Gibson is bordered to the west by the city of Muskogee, the Muskogee County seat.

The Neosho River follows the northwest border of the town and joins the Arkansas River, which flows just west of the town boundary, then forms the southern boundary.

U.S. Route 62 passes through the southern part of Fort Gibson, leading west  to the center of Muskogee and northeast  to Tahlequah.

Demographics

As of the census of 2000, there were 4,054 people, 1,467 households, and 1,113 families residing in the town. The population density was 301.8 inhabitants per square mile (116.5/km2). There were 1,563 housing units at an average density of 116.4 per square mile (44.9/km2). The racial makeup of the town was 68.75% White, 2.00% African American, 19.76% Native American, 0.12% Asian, 2.54% from other races, and 6.83% from two or more races. Hispanic or Latino of any race were 4.88% of the population.

There were 1,467 households, out of which 43.4% had children under the age of 18 living with them, 57.9% were married couples living together, 14.2% had a female householder with no husband present, and 24.1% were non-families. 21.6% of all households were made up of individuals, and 9.1% had someone living alone who was 65 years of age or older. The average household size was 2.72 and the average family size was 3.16.

In the town, the population was spread out, with 30.8% under the age of 18, 9.5% from 18 to 24, 27.3% from 25 to 44, 21.1% from 45 to 64, and 11.3% who were 65 years of age or older. The median age was 33 years. For every 100 females, there were 91.0 males. For every 100 females age 18 and over, there were 85.3 males.

The median income for a household in the town was $30,975, and the median income for a family was $36,944. Males had a median income of $30,362 versus $21,525 for females. The per capita income for the town was $14,042. About 14.2% of families and 16.5% of the population were below the poverty line, including 22.3% of those under age 18 and 23.9% of those age 65 or over.

Government
Federal representation: Senator James Lankford, Senator Jim Inhofe, Representative Markwayne Mullin

Historic Sites
 
NRHP-listed sites in Fort Gibson include:
 Fort Gibson (the fort site at Lee and Ash Streets)
 Administration Building-Post Hospital
 Commandant's Quarters
 Dragoon Commandant's Quarters
 Officer's Quarters
 Post Adjutant's Office
 Post Blacksmith Shop
 Cherokee National Cemetery
 Nash-Swindler House
 Seawell-Ross-Isom House

Notable people
Junior Kennedy, Major League Baseball player born in Fort Gibson
Teddy Lehman, professional football player 
Frank Linzy, pitcher for San Francisco Giants
Lee Wiley, jazz singer

See also
 Black Seminoles (Cimarrones)
 Buffalo Soldiers at Fort Leavenworth

References

External links
 Fort Gibson Chamber of Commerce
 Fort Gibson Public Schools
 Fort Gibson Historical Society
 Fort Gibson information, photos and videos on TravelOK.com Official travel and tourism website for the State of Oklahoma
 Kansas Territory: Frontier Military Scenic Byway
 Encyclopedia of Oklahoma History and Culture - Fort Gibson (town)

Towns in Cherokee County, Oklahoma
Towns in Muskogee County, Oklahoma